Artemis Ridge is a ridge,  long, rising to  between Thomas Valley and the southwest part of Clark Glacier in the Olympus Range of the McMurdo Dry Valleys, Antarctica. In keeping with the names from Greek mythology grouped in this area, it was named by the New Zealand Geographic Board (1998) after Artemis, a goddess associated with the moon.

References 

Ridges of Victoria Land
McMurdo Dry Valleys